Filicide is the deliberate act of a parent killing their own child. The word can refer to both the crime and perpetrator of the crime.

Statistics
A 1999 U.S. Department of Justice study concluded that mothers were responsible for a higher share of children killed during infancy between 1976 and 1997 in the United States, while fathers were more likely to have been responsible for the murders of children aged eight or older. Parents were responsible for 61% of child murders under the age of five. Sometimes, there is a combination of murder and suicide in filicide cases. On average, according to FBI statistics, 450 children are murdered by their parents each year in the United States.

An in-depth longitudinal study of 297 cases convicted of filicide and 45 of filicide-suicide in the United Kingdom between 1997 and 2006 showed that 37% of the perpetrators had a recorded mental illness at the time. The most common diagnoses were mood disorders and personality disorders rather than psychosis, but the latter accounted for 15% of cases. However – similar to findings in a large Danish study – the majority had not had contact with mental health services prior to the murders, and few had received treatment. Female perpetrators were more likely to have given birth as teenagers. Fathers were more likely to have been convicted of violent offences and have a history of substance misuse, and were more likely to kill multiple victims. Infants were more likely to be victims than older children, and a link to post-partum depression was suggested.

Types of filicide 
Dr. Phillip Resnick published research on filicide in 1969 and stated that there were five main motives for filicide, including "altruistic", "fatal maltreatment", "unwanted child", and "spousal revenge". "Altruistic" killings occur because the parent believes that the world is too cruel for the child, or because the child is enduring suffering (whether this is actually occurring or not). In fatal maltreatment killings, the goal is not always to kill the child, but death may occur anyway, and Munchausen syndrome by proxy is in that category. Spousal revenge killings are killings of children done to indirectly harm a domestic partner; they do not frequently occur. Glen Carruthers, author of "Making sense of spousal revenge filicide", argued that those who engage in spousal revenge killings see their own children as objects.

Children at risk 
In 2013, in the United States, homicide was in the top five causes of deaths of children, and in the top three causes of death in children between 1 and 4 years old. A direct correlation has been identified between child abuse rates and child homicide rates. Research suggests that children who are murdered by their parents were physically abused victims prior to death.

Notable Examples

Examples in fiction

Literature 
At the end of the Stephen King novel Carrie, the titular character is fatally wounded by her mother.
The plot of the Stephen King novel The Shining is based around the central character going insane and attempting to murder his wife and son.

Film and Television
In the show Inuyasha, the bat daiyōkai Taigokumaru killed his son Tsukuyomaru after he learned to protect his human wife Shizu's village.
The 1987 film The Stepfather was loosely inspired by the crimes of John List.

Games
In the Nintendo DS video game Inuyasha: Secret of the Divine Jewel, in 1000 AD Heian period, during the interruption of Tsugumi and Datara's wedding ceremony, after the cat half-demon Gorai, Lord of the Northern Lands forced Datara to wear the demon mask, Tsugumi use the Lightning Sealing Arrow to seal her husband and kill her demigod child from falling into the hands of the demon.

See also
 Foeticide, the killing of a fetus
 Neonaticide, the killing of a child during the first 24 hours of life 
 Infanticide, the killing of an infant from birth to 12 months
 Child murder, the murder of a child in general
 Filial cruelty, cruelty toward one's own child
 Child abuse, cruelty toward any child
 Avunculicide, the killing of one's uncle
 Fratricide, the killing of one's brother
 Mariticide, the killing of one's husband
 Matricide, the killing of one's mother
 Nepoticide, the killing of one's nephew
 Parricide, the killing of one's parents or another close relative
 Patricide, the killing of one's father
 Sororicide, the killing of one's sister
 Uxoricide, the killing of one's wife or girlfriend
 Nepticide, the killing of one's niece
 Amiticide, the killing of one's aunt
 La Llorona
 Medea

References

Further reading
 
 Meyer, Cheryl; Oberman, Michelle; White, Kelly (2001). Mothers who Kill Their Children. New York University Press.

External links
 Classifications and Descriptions of Parents Who Commit Filicide (PDF)
 CRG 52/14-15: Filicide in Australia, 2000-2012 A National Report

 
Homicide
Filicide
Killings by type

ja:子殺し